Oslo and Akershus University College (abbr. HiOA) was the largest state university college in Norway from its establishment in 2011 until 2018, when it was transformed into Oslo Metropolitan University, the youngest of Norway's new universities.

It had more than 20,000 students and 2,100 employees. HiOA had higher education programs at bachelor's, master's and PhD level. It offered studies and conducted research in health professions, social sciences, engineering, liberal arts, and other fields.

HiOA was established in 2011 following the merger of Oslo University College and Akershus University College, which were themselves the results of many previous mergers. In 2014 the Work Research Institute and Norwegian Social Research were also merged into the institution, and from 2016 it also incorporates the Norwegian Institute for Urban and Regional Research and the National Institute for Consumer Research. Most of the university college was located in the city centre of Oslo along the Pilestredet street, with subsidiary campuses in Sandvika and Kjeller in Akershus.

Education

The language of instruction was Norwegian, and certain courses were taught in English, both on bachelor's degree and master's degree level and to some extent on PhD level.

Management

Curt Rice, an American linguist who was formerly a professor at the University of Tromsø, became rector on August 1, 2015. He is not the first non-Norwegian to head a Norwegian university or college however, as the University of Oslo has been headed by the French-born Oscar I of Sweden and various Swedish statesmen as chancellors.

Faculties 
Faculty of Health Sciences
Faculty of Education and International Studies
Faculty of Social Sciences
Faculty of Technology, Art and Design

Centres 
Centre for Educational Research and Development
Centre for Welfare and Labour Research
Centre for the Study of Professions
National Centre for Multicultural Education
Learning Centre

Centre for the Study of Professions 
Centre for the Study of Professions (CSP) was formally opened in 1999 in order to stimulate research and critical reflection within the study of professions.

The study of professions includes several areas of research, such as:
 professional practice, its autonomy, social organisation, and governance
 the qualification of professionals, work motivation, and professional careers
 the social and historical role of professions

CSP develops the study of professions as a multidisciplinary field of research emphasising comparative approaches. The goal of CSP is to become a leading research facility within the study of professions in the Nordic countries.

CSP carries out a number of projects and activities, among them
 Ph.D. programme in the study of professions
 Various research projects
 StudData – Database for Studies of Recruitment and Qualification in the Professions

Ongoing research projects in English:
 Qualifying for professional careers (QPC)
 Teachers' Professional Qualification (TPQ)

CSP currently employs approximately 40 professors, researchers, fellows and administrative staff. CSP also hosts the open access journal Professions and Professionalism.

Centre for the Study of Professions
 Centre for the Study of Professions
 Qualifying for professional Careers (QPC)
 Teachers' Professional Qualification (TPQ)

Centre for Welfare and Labour Research
Centre for Welfare and Labour Research (SVA) consists of Work Research Institute (AFI), Norwegian Social Research (NOVA), Norwegian Institute for Urban and Regional Research (NIBR), and Consumption Research Norway (SIFO).

 http://www.hioa.no/eng/About-HiOA/Centre-for-Welfare-and-Labour-Research

References

 Molander, Anders and Lars Inge Terum (2008): Profesjonsstudier. Oslo: Universitetsforlaget

External links
Oslo and Akershus University College website
Courses taught in English at Oslo and Akershus University College

See also
 Library assessment

 
Education in Oslo
Oslo
Florence Network
Educational institutions established in 2011
Educational institutions disestablished in 2018
2011 establishments in Norway
2018 disestablishments in Norway
Universities and colleges formed by merger in Norway